Sivert Engh Øverby (born 10 June 1999) is a Norwegian footballer who plays as a defender for Mjøndalen.

Career
Øverby started his career with Hønefoss, where he made his senior debut in August 2016. In the summer of 2018, he moved to Fana. In the 2020 season, the Norwegian Third Division was cancelled due to the COVID-19 pandemic, and Øverby did not play any games. On 12 May 2021, he signed for Mjøndalen. Four days later, he made his Eliteserien debut in a 3–0 win against Sandefjord.

References

External links

1999 births
Living people
People from Ringerike (municipality)
Association football defenders
Norwegian footballers
Hønefoss BK players
Fana IL players
Mjøndalen IF players
Norwegian Third Division players
Norwegian Second Division players
Norwegian First Division players
Eliteserien players
Sportspeople from Viken (county)